Feminist Theory is a peer-reviewed academic journal that covers the field of women’s studies. The journal's editors-in-chief are Stacy Gillis (Newcastle University), Celia Roberts (Lancaster University), Carolyn Pedwell (Newcastle University), and  Sarah Kember (Goldsmith's College). It was established in 2000 and is currently published by SAGE Publications.

Abstracting and indexing 
Feminist Theory is abstracted and indexed in Scopus and the Social Sciences Citation Index. According to the Journal Citation Reports, its 2015 impact factor is 1.268, ranking it 12th out of 40 journals in the category "Women's Studies".

See also 
 List of women's studies journals

References

External links 
 

English-language journals
Feminist journals
Publications established in 2000
SAGE Publishing academic journals
Triannual journals
Women's studies journals